The James Milne House is an historic Gothic Revival home built by carpenter James Milne, in what is now the Historic McGloughlin Neighborhood in Oregon City, Oregon, United States. It is listed on the National Register of Historic Places. Milne, an immigrant from New Brunswick, Canada, designed and built the home in 1869.

References

1869 establishments in Oregon
Buildings and structures in Oregon City, Oregon
Houses completed in 1869
Gothic Revival architecture in Oregon
Houses on the National Register of Historic Places in Oregon